Faro station is the main railway station in the city of Faro, Portugal, operated by . It opened on 1 July 1889.

The line to the north-west is electrified, using overhead catenary, the line east, to the terminus at Vila Real de Santo António, is not.

In 1999, following the creation of a rail crossing over the River Tagus at Lisbon, the Alfa Pendular high speed electric tilting train service was introduced on the Braga-Oporto-Lisbon-Faro line, with through trains south of Lisbon starting in 2003.

Faro currently receives Alfa Pendular, Intercities and regional trains. 

Although Seville is less than 200km away, Faro does not have any railway connection crossing the border to Spain.

References

External links 

 Photos of Faro Station Railfaneurope
 Photos of Faro Station Railpictures

Railway stations in Portugal
Railway stations opened in 1889
Buildings and structures in Faro, Portugal
Linha do Algarve